The Northwest African Coastal Air Force (NACAF) was a specialized functional command of the combined Northwest African Air Forces.  The Mediterranean Air Command (MAC) oversaw the combined air forces until superseded by the MAAF. 

The NACAF had responsibility for air defense of North Africa, sea/air reconnaissance, antisubmarine air operations, air protection of Allied shipping, and air interdiction of enemy shipping. The components of NACAF at the time of the Allied invasion of Sicily (Operation Husky) on July 10, 1943 are illustrated below.

Order of Battle

Northwest African Coastal Air ForceAir Vice-Marshal Sir Hugh LloydOrder of Battle, July 10, 1943

Notes:
^No. 242 Group was originally a part of the Northwest African Tactical Air Force (NATAF) but later transferred to NACAF.
The 1st and 2nd Antisubmarine Squadrons were assigned to NACAF for administration and placed under the operational control of United States Navy Fleet Air Wing 15 of the Moroccan Sea Frontier commanded by Rear Admiral Frank J. Lowry.
No. 144 Squadron was attached from the United Kingdom.
Air Ministry was asked to provide two additional Wellington squadrons.
An Africa-based RAF Hudson of No. 608 Squadron was the first aircraft to sink a U-boat using rockets.

See also

 List of Royal Air Force commands

References

Citations

Bibliography
 Howe, George F., Northwest Africa: Seizing the Initiative in the West, Center of Military History, Washington, DC., 1991.

Allied air commands of World War II
Military units and formations established in 1943